The New-York Directory, published in 1786, was the first extant directory for New York City and the third published in the United States. It listed 846 names. A year earlier, the first two in the country were published in Philadelphia – the first, compiled by Francis White, was initially printed October 27, 1785, and the second, compiled by John Macpherson (1726–1792), was initially printed November 22, 1785.

Timeline and highlights

Selected New York City (Manhattan) directories (online)

New York City (Manhattan) directories

Great Metropolis directories

Business directories

Copartnership directories

Tax records

Citizens and strangers' guides

Route and city guides

Charities, social services, and church directories

Public education directories

Directories of directors

Directories related to investment securities and banking

Printing Trades Blue Book

Elite directories

Annual registers

The Reference registers

Maps and atlases

New York City medical directories

Railway and other public transit references

Society directories, including social registers

Early Harlem history (16th and 17th centuries)

Unions

Greater New York dictionaries

New York City Corporation documents

Military directories

Genealogical societies

New York State directories

State lawyer directories

State medical directories

Surrounding area travel guides

The Eno Collection of New York City Views

Architects in Practice, New York City

National directory of architects

Other directories and city references

Old Merchants of New York City

New York history bibliography and biographical references 

, compiled by a special committee ...

Selected New York City directories not found online 

 Wilson's

 Trow's

 Longworth's American Almanack, New-York Register, and City Directory

 Longworth's American Almanac, New-York Register, and City Directory

 Doggett's New York City Directory

 Rode's

 Citizen and Stranger's Guide

 Guide books: Taintor's Route and City Guides

 Other

Notes and references

References 

History of New York City
Directories
Publications established in 1786
18th century in New York (state)
19th century in New York City
20th century in New York City
Books about New York City
City directories